Navvab may refer to:

Places
Navvab (district), a locality in Tehran, Iran
 Navvab Expressway, a highway in Tehran, Iran

People
Ásíyih Khánum (1820–1886), Bahá'u'lláh's first wife
Mir Mohsun Navvab (1833–1918), Azeri poet and artist
Navvab Safavi (1924–1955), a militant cleric